Solange Ashby is an Egyptologist, Nubiologist and archaeologist, whose expertise focuses on language and religion in ancient Egypt.

Career 
Ashby studied for a BA in Intercultural Studies at Bard College at Simon's Rock. She graduated with a PhD in Egyptology from the University of Chicago. Her doctoral research took place at the temple of Philae in Egypt, as well as excavating at the Kushite cemetery of El-Kurru in Sudan. Her research examined the inscriptions, including graffiti, made by Kushite visitors, who travelled to the Egyptian temples in Lower Nubia.

In January 2021 she is due to take up a position in the Department of Classics and Ancient Studies at Barnard College, New York, as an Adjunct Professor. She has held fellowships at the Catholic University’s Institute of Christian Oriental Research and the American Research Centre in Egypt and has taught at the American University in Washington.

Media 
In 2018, Ashby featured in a documentary directed by Taaqiy Grant, which looked at many aspects of Ancient Egyptian civilisation, including its barter-based economic system. In 2020, she featured in the film series Hapi, which focused on the role of economics in civilisation.

Publications 

 Calling Out To Isis: the Enduring Nubian Presence at Philae (2020)
 "Milk Libations for Osiris: Nubian Piety at Philae" in Near Eastern Archaeology (2019)
 "Dancing for Hathor: Nubian Women in Egyptian Cultic Life" in Dotawo: A Journal of Nubian Studies (2018)
 “Meroitic Worship of Isis at Philae” (2011)

References

Further reading 
Ashby, Solange (2018) "Dancing for Hathor: Nubian Women in Egyptian Cultic Life," Dotawo: A Journal of Nubian Studies: Vol. 5 , Article 2.

External links 
 Dr. Solange Ashby on Calling Out to Isis and the Hapi Film
 Women Also Know History: Dr Solange Ashby

American women archaeologists
University of Chicago alumni
Barnard College faculty
American Egyptologists
African-American academics
African-American women academics
American women academics
African-American archaeologists
Living people
21st-century American archaeologists
Year of birth missing (living people)
21st-century American women
21st-century African-American women
21st-century African-American scientists